The Lake Fork River is a river in Duchesne County, Utah in the United States. The river is dammed near its headwaters to form Moon Lake, formerly a smaller natural lake.

See also

 List of rivers of Utah
 List of tributaries of the Colorado River

References

Rivers of Utah
Rivers of Duchesne County, Utah